Edmund Nathanael Powell (2 September 1859 – 11 April 1928) was Bishop of Mashonaland from 1908 to 1910.

He was born in Buckhurst Hill, educated at Winchester and Trinity College, Oxford and ordained in 1884. His first post was a curacy in Chelmsford after which he was Priest in charge of the  Beckton Mission. He was then Vicar of St Stephen, Upton Park before his elevation to the episcopate. At some point, he gained a Doctorate of Divinity (DD).

On his return to England he held further Incumbencies at St Saviour, Poplar and St Nicholas Castle Hedingham.

References

1859 births
People from Buckhurst Hill
People educated at Winchester College
Alumni of Trinity College, Oxford
20th-century Anglican bishops in Africa
Anglican bishops of Harare and Mashonaland
1928 deaths